Jimmie Jansson (born July 30, 1994) is a Swedish ice hockey defenceman. He is currently playing with HV71 of the Swedish Hockey League (SHL).

Jansson made his Swedish Hockey League debut playing with HV71 during the 2013–14 SHL season.

References

External links

1994 births
Living people
HV71 players
Swedish ice hockey defencemen